Yeon Joon-seok (born December 15, 1995) is a South Korean actor.

Filmography

Film

Television series

Theater

Awards and nominations

References

External links
  
 
 
 
 

1995 births
IHQ (company) artists
Living people
South Korean male film actors
South Korean male television actors
South Korean male child actors
South Korean male web series actors